Donald Durbin (born November 28, 1936) is an American sports shooter. He competed in the men's 50 metre rifle, prone event at the 1984 Summer Olympics.

References

External links
 

1936 births
Living people
American male sport shooters
Olympic shooters of the United States
Shooters at the 1984 Summer Olympics
People from New Albany, Indiana